The first Romanian domestic cricket competition took place on September 18–19, 2010 in Bucharest, and was organized by Cricket Romania,(CRC), the Romanian cricket board.

Teams
Currently, there are 5 clubs affiliated to CRC:
Banat Lions Cricket Club – Timișoara (BLCC)
Clubul Sportiv Studentesc "Medicina" – Timișoara (CSSM)
Indian Cricket Club of Bucharest – Bucharest (ICCB)
Transylvania Cricket Club – Bucharest (TCC)
Cluj Cricket Club – Cluj-Napoca (CCC)

However, Cluj Cricket Club will not participate at this tournament due to most of its players being away on holiday.
CSSM CC has had to pull out in the last minute and as not to rearrange the tournament structure, it was decided that Bucharest Cricket Club (BCC) who are in the process of becoming affiliated members of CRC be invited to join the tournament, which they have. They come in place of CSSM.

Indian Cricket Club of Bucharest are the 2010 Romanian Twenty20 cricket champions.

Standings

POINT SYSTEM: Winner (4 points), Loser (2), Bowling bonus (batting side all out)(2),Batting bonus (target in 12 overs) (2)

Matches

Final 

Man of the tournament: Vicky Manani (ICCB)

External links
Official Website

Cricket in Romania